Panuramine (Wy-26,002) is an antidepressant which was synthesized in 1981 by Wyeth. It acts as a potent and selective serotonin reuptake inhibitor (SSRI). It was never marketed.

See also 
 Selective serotonin reuptake inhibitor

References 

Benzamides
2-Naphthyl compounds
Piperidines
Selective serotonin reuptake inhibitors
Ureas